Landscape fabric is a textile material used to control weeds by inhibiting their exposure to sunlight.  The fabric is normally placed around desirable plants, covering areas where other growth is unwanted.  The fabric itself can be made from synthetic or organic materials, sometimes from recycled sources.

References 
Gardening aids
Horticulture